The 2019-20 Merrimack Warriors Men's ice hockey season was the 65th season of play for the program, the 31st at the Division I level, and the 31st season in the Hockey East conference. The Warriors represented Merrimack College and were coached by Scott Borek, in his 2nd season.

Departures

Recruiting

Roster
As of January 1, 2020.

Standings

Schedule and Results

|-
!colspan=12 style=";" | Regular Season

Scoring Statistics

Goaltending statistics

Rankings

Players drafted into the NHL

2020 NHL Entry Draft

† incoming freshman

References

2019–20
Merrimack Warriors
Merrimack Warriors
2019 in sports in Massachusetts
2020 in sports in Massachusetts